Kottayam Diocese is one of the 30 dioceses of the Malankara Orthodox Syrian Church. The diocese was created in Mulanthuruthy Synod in 1876.

History

Kottayam is one of the seven dioceses created after the Mulanthuruthi Christian association (synod) conducted under the leadership of Ignatios Pathros III, Patriarch of Antioch in 1876. Others are Kollam, Kandanadu, Angamali, Niranam, Thumpamon, Kochi.
In initial time there were 20 churches in the diocese. Kadavil Paulose Mar Athanasios was the first Metropolitan. After this, Paulose Mar Evanios, later Baselios Paulose I become Metropolitan. Then, Geevarghese Mar Pilaxinos, later Baselios Geevarghese I, Vattaserill Mar Dionysius led the diocese. Kuriakos Mar Gregorios (Pampadi Thirumeni) led the diocese in the period of 1929–1965. In this time Pampady Daira become head office. Paret Mathews Mar Ivanios was appointed as Assistant Metropolitan in 1954 and as Metropolitan from 1965 to 1980. Joseph Mar Pacomios, Yuhanon Mar Athanasios led the diocese as assistant Metropolitans.
In 1982 Kottayam diocese was divided into Kottayam, Kottayam Central and Idukki dioceses. In 1985 August, Geevarghese Mar Evanios become Metropolitan. In 1987, head office shifted to Kuriakos Mar Gregorios Centre. In 1992, there were 6 chapels, 70 parishes and one cathedral in the diocese.

Now

Now, this diocese is ruled directly by Catholicos of the East. The head office of Kottayam diocese is situated in Kuriakose Mar Gregorios Centre, MD Seminary, Kottayam. There are numerous institutes work under this diocese. Pampadi Kuriakose Dayara, MGM Abhaya Bhavan, MGM Bala Bhavan, Mar Ivanios ITC, BMM English Medium school etc. are some of them. Some colleges of Malankara Church is in the boundary of this diocese.

Parishes

1) Manarcad St.Marys Orthodox Cathedral

2) Amayannoor Kazhunnuvalam Methranchery St.Thomas Orthodox Church

3) Amayannoor Karattukunnel St.Marys Orthodox Church

4) Areeparambu St.George Orthodox Church

5) Anicadu Mar Gregorios Orthodox Church

6) Changnasherry St.Thomas Orthodox Church

7) Chingavanam St.Johns mission Orthodox Church

8) Chenamkary St.Thomas Orthodox Church

9) Cheeranchira St.Marys Orthodox Church

10) Ettumanoor St.George Orthodox Church

11) Kangazha St.Thomas Orthodox Church

12) Kangazha Chettedom St.Marys Orthodox Church

13) Kannukuzhy St.Marys Orthodox Church

14) Kallunkathra Manalel St.George Orthodox Church

15) Kanam St.Marys Orthodox Church

16) Kanam St.George Orthodox Church

17) Kurichy St.Marys and St.Johns Orthodox Church

18) Kurichy St.peters and St.pauls Orthodox Church

19) Kanam Vetuvelil St.Thomas Orthodox Church

20) Kumarakom St.Johns Orthodox Church

21) Kuppapuram St.Thomas Orthodox Church

22) Kooroppada St.Johns Orthodox Church

23) Koottickal St.Marys Orthodox Church

24) Kumaramkode Mar Gregorios

25) Kolladu St.Pauls Orthodox Church

26) Kothala Sehion Orthodox Church

27) Meenadom North St.Marys Orthodox Church

28) Meenadom Vadakke St.Johns Orthodox Church

29) Meenadom Kizhakke St.George Orthodox Church

30) Meenadom St.George Orthodox Church

31) Meenadom St.Thomas Orthodox Church

32) Mundathanam St.Johns Orthodox Church

33) Mundakayam St.Thomas Orthodox Church

34) Moolavattom St.Marys Orthodox Church

35) Njaliyakuzhy Mar Gregorios Orthodox Church

36) Nalumnakkal Mar Gregorios Orthodox Church

37) Neelimangalam Mar Gregorios Catholicate center (Neelimangalam St.Marys Orthodox Church)

38) Nedumavu St.pauls Orthodox Church

39) Olassa St.Johns Orthodox Church

40) Pariyaram Mar Aprem Orthodox Church

41) Pariyaram St.Thomas Orthodox Church

42) Pariyaram St.Peters Orthodox Church

43) Pallom karamoodu St.Marys Sehion Orthodox Church

44) Pallom St.pauls Orthodox Church

45) Pampady St.Johns Orthodox Cheriyapali

46) Pampady St.Johns Orthodox Cathedral

47) Pathamuttom Sleeba Orthodox Church

48) Pangada St.Marys Orthodox Church

49) Parathode St George Catholicate center (St.George Gracy Memorial Orthodox Church)

50) Parampuzha St.George Orthodox Church

51) Pachira Thabore St.Marys Orthodox Church

52) Pala St.Marys Orthodox Church

53) Puthupally St.George Orthodox Valiyapali

54) Puthupally Nilackal Orthodox Church

55) Pongamthanam St.Thomas Orthodox Church

56) Ponkunnam St.Marys Orthodox Church

57) South Pampady St.Thomas Orthodox Valiyapali

58) Thiruvarppu Marthasmuni Orthodox Church

59) Thrikkothamangalam St.James Orthodox Church

60) Thengana St.Thomas Orthodox Church

61) Thottakadu St.Marys Orthodox Church

62) Vadekanmanoor St.Thomas Orthodox Church

63) Vakathanam St.Johns Orthodox Valiyapali

64) Vakathanam Jerusalem St.Marys Orthodox Church

65) Vakathanam St.peters and St.pauls Mission Orthodox Church

66) Vakathanam Puthenchantha St.Marys Orthodox Church

67) Vakathanam Vettikunel St.George Orthodox Church

68) Vakathanam Puthenchantha St.George Orthodox Church

69) Vazhoor St.peters Orthodox Church

70) Vellukutta St.Thomas Orthodox Church

71) Vellor St.Thomas Orthodox Church

References

External links
Website of Malankara Orthodox Church

Malankara Orthodox Syrian Church dioceses
1876 establishments in India